Stenognathus is a genus of beetles in the family Carabidae, containing the following species:

 Stenognathus batesi Chaudoir, 1877 
 Stenognathus chaudoiri Ball, 1975 
 Stenognathus crassus Chaudoir, 1869 
 Stenognathus crenulatus Chaudoir, 1869 
 Stenognathus dentifemoratus Shpeley & Ball, 2000 
 Stenognathus dentifer (Chaudoir, 1869) 
 Stenognathus gagatinus (Dejean, 1831) 
 Stenognathus jauja Shpeley & Ball, 2000 
 Stenognathus longipennis Chaudoir, 1877 
 Stenognathus luctuosus (Maindron, 1906) 
 Stenognathus melanarius (Dejean, 1831) 
 Stenognathus nigropiceus (Bates, 1869) 
 Stenognathus onorei Shpeley & Ball, 2000 
 Stenognathus platypterus Chaudoir, 1869 
 Stenognathus plaumanni Shpeley & Ball, 2000 
 Stenognathus procerus (Putzeys, 1878) 
 Stenognathus quadricollis Chaudoir, 1869 
 Stenognathus robustus (Bates, 1884) 
 Stenognathus stricticollis (Maindron, 1906)

References

Lebiinae